José Ribamar Ferreira (September 10, 1930 – December 4, 2016), known by his pen name Ferreira Gullar, was a Brazilian poet, playwright, essayist, art critic, and television writer. In 1959, he was instrumental in the formation of the Neo-Concrete Movement.

Influence of Neo-Concretes
The Neo-Concrete Manifesto was written in 1959 by Gullar and begins:
We use the term "neo-concrete" to differentiate ourselves from those committed to non-figurative "geometric" art (neoplasticism, constructivism, suprematism, the school of Ulm) and particularly the kind of concrete art that is influenced by a dangerously acute rationalism. In the light of their artistic experience, the painters, sculptors, engravers and writers participating in this first neo-concrete exhibition came to the conclusion that it was necessary to evaluate the theoretical principles on which concrete art has been founded, none of which offers a rationale for the expressive potential they feel their art contains.

As seen in this excerpt, the Neo-Concrete Movement seeks to move beyond the Concrete Artist's ideal of mathematical purity in art and embrace phenomenology. Gullar continues on in his manifesto to call for an artwork that “amounts to more than the sum of its constituent elements; something which analysis may break down into various elements but which can only be understood phenomenologically.” The Neo-Concretists believed artworks should interact with the spectator and make the spectator more aware of his or her physical body and metaphysical existence. It is only with the participation of the spectator that the artwork becomes complete.

Early life, "Poema Sujo" and exile
Ferreira Gullar was born in São Luís, Maranhão, Northeast Brazil. He was exiled by the Brazilian dictatorship that lasted from 1964 to 1985, a period who saw him living in the Soviet Union, Chile, Peru and Argentina. 

In 1975, while living in Argentina, Gullar wrote his best-known work, "Poema Sujo" ("Dirty Poem" in English), in which he attributes his decision to stop writing poetry to the increasing persecution of exiles, many of whom were found dead, and to hypothetical thoughts about his own death. He spent months writing the more than 2,000 verses that constitute the poem. "Dirty Poem" draws on his memories of childhood and adolescence in São Luís, Maranhão, and his anguish at being far from his homeland.

Gullar read the poem at Augusto Boal's house in Buenos Aires during a meeting organized by Vinicius de Moraes. The reading, recorded on tape, became well known among Brazilian intellectuals, who tried to guarantee Gullar's returned to Brazil in 1977, where he continued writing for newspapers and publishing books. He also had a weekly column in Brazilian newspaper Folha de S.Paulo, published on Sundays.

Notability
In 2002 Gullar was honoured with a Prince Claus Award from the Dutch organisation, the Prince Claus Fund.

Gullar was considered one of the most influential Brazilians of the 20th century by Época magazine, and was awarded the Jabuti Prize for best fiction book in 2007. The magazine recalls its critical stance in opinion articles about the populism of former President Lula da Silva, posted in national newspaper Folha de S.Paulo.

On October 9, 2014, Gullar was elected as a member of the Brazilian Academy of Letters.

Death
Gullar died of pneumonia on December 4, 2016.

Bibliography
Poetry
 Um pouco acima do chão, 1949
 A luta corporal, 1954
 Poemas, 1958
 João Boa-Morte, cabra marcado para morrer (cordel), 1962
 Quem matou Aparecida? (cordel), 1962
 A luta corporal e novos poemas, 1966
 História de um valente, (cordel, na clandestinidade, como João  Salgueiro), 1966
 Por você por mim, 1968
 Dentro da noite veloz, 1975
 Poema sujo, 1976
 Na vertigem do dia, 1980
 Crime na flora ou Ordem e progresso, 1986
 Barulhos, 1987
 O formigueiro, 1991
 Muitas vozes, 1999

Anthologies
 Antologia poética, 1977
 Toda poesia, 1980
 Ferreira Gullar - seleção de Beth Brait, 1981
 Os melhores poemas de Ferreira Gullar - seleção de Alfredo Bosi, 1983
 Poemas escolhidos, 1989

Short stories
 Gamação, 1996
 Cidades inventadas, 1997

Theater
 Um rubi no umbigo, 1979

Chronicles
 A estranha vida banal, 1989
 O menino e o arco-íris, 2001

Memories
 Rabo de foguete - Os anos de exílio, 1998

Biography
 Nise da Silveira: uma psiquiatra rebelde, 1996

Essays
 Teoria do não-objeto, 1959
 Cultura posta em questão, 1965
 Vanguarda e subdesenvolvimento, 1969
 Augusto do Anjos ou Vida e morte nordestina, 1977
 Tentativa de compreensão: arte concreta, arte neoconcreta - Uma contribuição brasileira, 1977
 Uma luz no chão, 1978
 Sobre arte, 1983
 Etapas da arte contemporânea: do cubismo à arte neoconcreta, 1985
 Indagações de hoje, 1989
 Argumentação contra a morte da arte, 1993
 O Grupo Frente e a reação neoconcreta, 1998
 Cultura posta em questão/Vanguarda e subdesenvolvimento, 2002
 Rembrandt, 2002
 Relâmpagos, 2003

Television
 Araponga - 1990/1991 (Rede Globo) - colaborador
 Dona Flor e Seus Dois Maridos - 1998 (Rede Globo) - colaborador
 Irmãos Coragem - 1995 (Rede Globo) - colaborador

References

External links
 
 
 Prince Claus Fund
 Poet Nexus
 

1930 births
2016 deaths
People from São Luís, Maranhão
Camões Prize winners
Brazilian columnists
Brazilian essayists
Brazilian art critics
Brazilian male poets
20th-century Brazilian poets
21st-century Brazilian poets
Authors of Brazilian telenovelas
Members of the Brazilian Academy of Letters
Deaths from pneumonia in Rio de Janeiro (state)
20th-century Brazilian male writers
21st-century Brazilian male writers
Male television writers
Brazilian expatriates in the Soviet Union
People granted political asylum in the Soviet Union